Líšťany is a municipality and village in Plzeň-North District in the Plzeň Region of the Czech Republic. It has about 700 inhabitants.

Administrative parts
Villages of Hunčice, Košetice, Lipno, Luhov, Náklov, Písek and Třebobuz are administrative parts of Líšťany.

References

Villages in Plzeň-North District